MCH Group is an international live-marketing company based in Basel, Switzerland. MCH Group's core business is staging its own fairs as well as guest events. The international art fair Art Basel is the leading exhibition of  MCH Group.

History 

MCH Group has its roots in the "Schweizer Mustermesse", founded in 1916. In 2001, Messe Basel and Messe Zürich merged to “Messe Schweiz”. In 2009, Messe Schweiz was renamed MCH Group AG. In addition, MCH Group also comprises Expomobilia, MCH Global, and MC2, as well as other holdings.

Until 2019, MCH Group hosted the annual watch and jewelry show BASELWORLD, which gathered all the industry players from around the world: manufacturers, buyers, retailers, collectors, media, and enthusiasts. Depending on the source, the demise of this fair is attributed to the profound upheavals of the market and its own management failures. At its peak around 2015, BASELWORLD hosted 1,500 exhibitors from 40 nations on 140,000 square meters and welcomed over 150,000 visitors.

Organization and shareholders 

MCH Group CEO Florian Faber was appointed in July 2022. The second member of the Executive Board is CFO Michael Hüsler. In 2022, MCH Group employed around 800 people. In the 2021 financial year, which was heavily impacted by the Covid-19 pandemic, the group posted sales of CHF 243.3 million and a net loss of CHF 17.3 million. MCH Group is listed on the SIX Swiss Exchange. The cantons of Basel-Stadt, Basel-Landschaft and Zurich and the city of Zurich held 49% of the share capital until 2020.The Extraordinary General Meeting of August 3 2020 approved two capital increases and the lifting of the restriction on transferability. It also agreed that Lupa Systems, an investment company controlled by James Murdoch, would become the new anchor shareholder of MCH Group with at least 30%, optionally up to 49%, and have representation on the Board of Directors. After a further capital increase in autumn 2022, Lupa's stake is 38.52%, with the public sector holding 39.02% (Canton Basel-Stadt 37.52%, Canton and City of Zurich 1.50%).

Field of Activity 
The core business of MCH Group is the organization of international and national exhibitions. The exhibition portfolio comprises around 25 exhibitions that are organized and staged by MCH Group's exhibition companies. The most important exhibitions include the international art fair Art Basel, with events in Basel, Miami Beach, Paris and Hong Kong, and the Swiss exhibitions Swissbau, IGEHO, Giardina, and HOLZ. Fantasy Basel is one of many guest exhibitions.

MCH Group also rents out its infrastructure in Basel and Zurich to external exhibition, congress and event organizers. The exhibition sites comprise an exhibition area of 162,000 m² in Basel and 33,000 m² in Zurich.

The third business field is Live Marketing Solutions, with the companies MCH Global, MC2 and Expomobilia. They offer services in the fields of strategy, conception, marketing, sponsoring, event management and stand construction.

References

External links
 Official website

Marketing companies